The 1986 Korean Football Festival was the fourth season of the top football league in South Korea. Six teams participated in this season. Five of them were professional teams (Yukong Elephants, Daewoo Royals, POSCO Atoms, Lucky-Goldstar Hwangso and Hyundai Horang-i) and one was a semi-professional team (Hanil Bank). Hallelujah FC, the first South Korean first professional football club, changed its status to a semi-professional club and withdrew from the league afterwards. Sangmu FC, run by the Army also withdrew, leaving Hanil Bank as the only semi-professional team in the league.

It began on 2 March and ended on 16 November. It consisted of two stages and winners of each stage qualify for the championship playoffs. Between the two stages, the Korean Professional Football Championship in which only professional teams participated was held from May to September.

Regular season

First stage

Second stage

Championship playoffs

Top scorers

Awards

Main awards

Source:

Best XI

Source:

See also
1986 K League Championship
Professional Football Championship (South Korea)

References

External links
 RSSSF

K League seasons
1
South Korea
South Korea